Tregada is a hamlet in the parish of Lawhitton, Cornwall, England, United Kingdom.

References

Hamlets in Cornwall